Ustye-Gorodishchenskoye is a rural locality (a village) in Nyuksenskoye Rural Settlement, Nyuksensky District, Vologda Oblast, Russia. The population was 65 as of 2002. There are 4 streets.

Geography 
Ustye-Gorodishchenskoye is located 21 km northeast of Nyuksenitsa (the district's administrative centre) by road. Berezovo is the nearest rural locality.

References 

Rural localities in Nyuksensky District